Hurley Allen McNair (October 28, 1888 - December 2, 1948) was a baseball player in the Negro leagues and the pre-Negro leagues.

At the age of 21, he was pitching for the Minneapolis Keystones. He left the Keystones halfway through the 1911 season and went to play for the Chicago Giants.

He played outfield and pitcher and played from 1911–1937, mostly playing for teams in Chicago and Kansas City, Missouri.  After his playing career ended, he also umpired in the Negro American League, including one game of the 1942 Colored World Series.

McNair died in Kansas City, Missouri on December 2, 1948, at the age of 60. He is buried at the Highland Cemetery in Kansas City, Missouri.

References

External links
 and Baseball-Reference Black Baseball stats and Seamheads

All Nations players
Chicago American Giants players
Chicago Giants players
Detroit Stars players
Kansas City Monarchs players
Minneapolis Keystones players
1888 births
1948 deaths
People from Marshall, Texas
20th-century African-American people
Baseball outfielders
Baseball pitchers
Kansas City Giants players
Kansas City Royal Giants players